The class D15 (class T, pre 1895) of the Pennsylvania Railroad comprised a solitary Lindner-system cross compound steam locomotive of 4-4-0 "American" wheel arrangement in the Whyte notation.  The sole locomotive was #1515, built in 1892 at the PRR's Altoona Shops, it had very British lines with a full-length footplate, splashers, a six-wheel tender, and large  drivers. It was built in 1892 by the PRR’s Altoona Works it remained in service until it was retired in 1945 and put in storage at the PRR’s Altoona Works and was scrapped in 1951 .

References

D15
4-4-0 locomotives
Compound locomotives
Railway locomotives introduced in 1892
Scrapped locomotives
Individual locomotives of the United States
Unique locomotives
Standard gauge locomotives of the United States